Carrie Elizabeth Lawrence (born July 15, 1997) is an American professional soccer player who plays as a defender for Orlando Pride of the National Women's Soccer League (NWSL).

Early life 
Growing up in Orlando, Florida, Lawrence was an All-Metro and All-State Player for Timber Creek High School and was named Offensive Player of the Year and Most Valuable Player while capturing Metro and District championships. She also lettered in flag football at school. Lawrence played club soccer for Florida Kraze Krush, winning state and regional championships, and was also a member of the Region III Olympic Development Program team.

College 
Lawrence was recruited to play college soccer by the University of South Carolina. She spent one season with the South Carolina Gamecocks in 2015 and appeared in all 20 matches, being voted team Rookie of the Year by her teammates. Lawrence transferred to the University of Central Florida ahead of her sophomore year in 2016 and played the following three seasons with the UCF Knights. In 2018, Lawrence was a Second Team All-AAC selection and was named to the United Soccer Coaches Association All-Region Third Team.

Professional career

Orlando Pride 
On January 10, 2020, Lawrence was signed by Orlando Pride as a supplemental player having spent the 2019 season training full-time with the club. She was ineligible to sign in 2019 having not declared for the draft. She was waived as part of final roster ahead of the 2020 NWSL Challenge Cup. With the 2020 NWSL season dealing with significant disruption during the COVID-19 pandemic, Lawrence rejoined the Pride, one of seven players signed to a short-term contract on September 8 in order to compete in the Fall Series following the team's decision to loan out 11 senior players to play regularly overseas. Lawrence made her NWSL debut on September 19, 2020 in the first fall series match, starting in a 0–0 draw with North Carolina Courage. She appeared in all four Fall Series matches for a combined 233 minutes. Ahead of the 2021 season, Lawrence re-signed with the club on a one-year deal with an option for an additional season.

International career 
In May 2015, Lawrence was called into the United States U19 training camp held at the U.S. Olympic Training Center in Chula Vista, California.

Career statistics

College

Club 
.

References

External links 
UCF Knights profile
 

1997 births
Living people
American women's soccer players
South Carolina Gamecocks women's soccer players
UCF Knights women's soccer players
Orlando Pride players
National Women's Soccer League players
Soccer players from Florida
People from Orlando, Florida
Women's association football defenders